Love Unlimited is the 1996 eighth album of Japanese band Dreams Come True.

Track listing
Love Unlimited
Sweet Revenge
誓い
Romance～∞ VERSION
嵐が来る～ALBUM VERSION  
思い出を胸に秘めたまま
モンキーガール 豪華客船の旅
家へ帰ろ  
7月7日、晴れ  
どうやって忘れよう?
Love Love Love
しあわせなからだ

Sales and certifications

References

1996 albums
Dreams Come True (band) albums